Al Richardson may refer to:

 Al Richardson (end) (1935–1977), American football player for the Boston Patriots
 Al Richardson (historian) (1941–2003), British Trotskyist historian and activist
 Al Richardson (linebacker) (born 1957), American football linebacker

See also
Alan Richardson (disambiguation)
Albert Richardson (disambiguation)
Alexander Richardson (disambiguation)
Richardson (surname)